Carversville Historic District is a national historic district located at Carversville, Solebury Township, Bucks County, Pennsylvania.  The district includes 57 contributing buildings in the village of Carversville.  The buildings include notable examples of the Late Victorian and Federal styles. Notable buildings are the Overpeck Homestead (c. 1703-1716), Fred Clark Art Museum (1873), and Carversville Christian Church (1866).

It was added to the National Register of Historic Places in 1978.

Gallery

References

Historic districts in Bucks County, Pennsylvania
Federal architecture in Pennsylvania
Historic districts on the National Register of Historic Places in Pennsylvania
National Register of Historic Places in Bucks County, Pennsylvania